Lawrence Joseph Klecatsky (August 11, 1941 – December 13, 2018) was an American rower. He competed in the men's double sculls event at the 1976 Summer Olympics.

References

1941 births
2018 deaths
American male rowers
Olympic rowers of the United States
Rowers at the 1976 Summer Olympics
People from South St. Paul, Minnesota
Sportspeople from Minnesota
Pan American Games medalists in rowing
Pan American Games silver medalists for the United States
Rowers at the 1975 Pan American Games